William de Bardelby (died 1337) was an English-born judge in Ireland.

He took his name from his birthplace, Barlby, North Yorkshire. He was probably a cousin of William de Bardelby, who was Keeper of the Great Seal of the Realm in the reign of King Edward II. Also Robert de Bardelby was an English judge at the beginning of the 14th century.

William de Bardelby was vicar of Coberley in Gloucestershire in 1316; he then moved to Ireland where he was presented to the living of Garristown, in north County Dublin, in 1318. In 1321 Roger de Sutton, journeying to England, appointed Bardelby his attorney to act for him in Ireland.  

He became Master of the Rolls in Ireland in 1334 (being only the second holder of the office) and held that position until his death in 1337.

In 1335 the Privy Council of Ireland sanctioned a gift of 100 shillings from the Crown to Bardelby and the Irish Chancery clerks for their diligence in writing commissions for the office of the Escheator.

References
Ball, F. Elrington The Judges in Ireland 1221–1921 John Murray London 1926
Smyth, Constantine Joseph Chronicle  of the Law Officers of Ireland London Butterworths 1839
Patent Roll 8 Edward III 
Close Roll 9 Edward III 

People from Selby District
1337 deaths
Year of birth unknown
Masters of the Rolls in Ireland